Irumbulikurichi is a village in the Sendurai taluk of Ariyalur district, Tamil Nadu, India.

Demographics 

As per the 2001 census, Irumbulikurichi had a total population of 3386 with 1698 males and 1688 females.

References 

Villages in Ariyalur district